"Never Let You Go" is the fourth single by Evermore, taken from their second studio album Real Life. It peaked in the top 30 of the ARIA Singles Chart.

Track listing

Video

The video of the single is of a series of clips of that show the meaning of the lyrics of being sung. The band appears throughout the video in blackface  in one scene and at the end. For example, when "GET" is said during the song, a picture of a 'GOT' sign appears. During the music video the Hume brothers (Jonn, Dann and Petey) are not seen performing or in any pictures. However, the brothers are in the video: in the center section three scientists are seen that have a shocking similarity to the brothers, secondly, Evermore is spotted dressed as lower-class men sitting together. They really are lower class now. In one scene they are shown shaking hands with Jar Jar Binks from Star Wars.

The song has also been part of the soundtrack of the Australian TV show McLeod's Daughters.

Charts

"Never Let You Go" peaked at number 29 on the ARIA Singles Chart.

Release history

References 

2006 songs
2007 singles
Evermore (band) songs
Songs written by Dann Hume
Songs written by Jon Hume
Warner Music Australasia singles